Richard, Duke of Burgundy (858–921), also known as Richard of Autun or Richard the Justiciar, was Count of Autun from 880 and the first Margrave and Duke of Burgundy. He eventually attained suzerainty over all the counties of Burgundy save Mâcon and by 890 he was referred to as dux (duke) and by 900 as marchio (margrave). By 918 he was being called dux Burgundionem or dux Burgundiae, which probably signified less the existence of a unified Burgundian dukedom than feudal suzerainty over a multiplicity of counties in a specific region.

Life 
Richard was a Bosonid, the son of Bivin of Gorze and Richildis. His elder brother was Boso of Provence and his younger sister was Richildis, second wife of Charles the Bald.

In 875, after the death of the Emperor Louis II, Richard and Boso accompanied Charles to Italy for his imperial coronation. In February 876, in Pavia, while preparing for his return journey, Charles nominated Boso "Duke and Viceroy of Italy and Duke of Provence". In 877, on Charles's death, Boso returned to France and confided the realm of Italy and the Duchy of Provence to Richard and Hugh the Abbot as missi dominici.

In 879, Boso declared himself "King of Provence" following the death of Louis the Stammerer, but Richard defected from Boso and took Boso's county of Autun, which Carloman II confirmed to him in 880. The two joined battle on the Saône and Richard captured Mâcon and garrisoned it in the name of Carloman and Louis III under the command of Bernard Plantapilosa, a relative of the hereditary counts of Mâcon. After taking Lyon, he besieged his brother's capital of Vienne, where he was joined by Louis, Carloman, and the emperor Charles the Fat. Richard eventually drove Boso out in 882 and captured his wife Ermengard and children Engelberga and Louis, sending them as prisoners to Autun. Boso went into hiding in Provence.

After the death of Charles the Fat in 888, Richard supported the claim of Duke Rudolph to be King of Upper Burgundy and married his sister Adelaide, daughter of Conrad II of Auxerre. Richard also supported the coronation of his nephew Louis as King of Provence in 890.

Richard died and was buried at Sens. He was exhorted by a bishop at his deathbed to beg a pardon for shedding so much blood in his life. He responded:

Family
By his wife Adelaide (married 888), daughter of Conrad II, Count of Auxerre, and Waldrada of Worms, he had several sons and daughters:
 Rudolph, successor and later King of Francia
 Hugh the Black, later Duke of Burgundy
 Boso, married Bertha, daughter of Boso, Margrave of Tuscany
 Ermengard, married Gilbert, Duke of Burgundy
 Adelaide, married Reginar II, Count of Hainaut
 Richilda, married Litaud I, Count of Mâcon

See also
 Dukes of Burgundy family tree

Notes

Sources
 Bouchard, Constance B. "The Bosonids or Rising to Power in the Late Carolingian Age." French Historical Studies, Vol. 15, No. 3. (Spring, 1988), pp 407–431.

858 births
921 deaths
Bosonids
Dukes of Burgundy
Counts of Burgundy
10th-century rulers in Europe
Year of birth unknown